Cascavel Esporte Clube, commonly known as Cascavel, was a Brazilian football club based in Cascavel, Paraná state that competed in the Série B and in the Série C twice.

History
The club was founded on December 19, 1979. Cascavel won the Campeonato Paranaense in 1980. The club competed in the Série B in 1981 and 1982 and was eliminated in the First Stage in both seasons. Cascavel competed in the Série C in 1995 and 1996 and was eliminated in the First Stage in both seasons. The club merged with SOREC and Cascavel S/A on December 17, 2001 to form Cascavel Clube Recreativo.

Achievements
 Campeonato Paranaense:
 Winners (1): 1980

Stadium

Cascavel Esporte Clube played its home games at Estádio Olímpico Regional Arnaldo Busatto. The stadium has a maximum capacity of 45,000 people.

References

Defunct football clubs in Paraná (state)
Association football clubs established in 1979
Association football clubs disestablished in 2001
1979 establishments in Brazil
2001 disestablishments in Brazil